ZFS may refer to:

Computing
 zFS (z/OS file system), by IBM
 zFS (IBM file system project), an experimental decentralized file system
 ZFS, a file system and logical volume manager
 ZFS+, ZFS with proprietary data de-duplication technology extensions by GreenBytes
 Oracle ZFS, a proprietary version of ZFS
 OpenZFS, an open-source derivative of Oracle ZFS

Other uses
 Zurich Financial Services
 Zero field splitting, a spectroscopic concept